The 1905 Bennett Medical football team was an American football team that represented Bennett Medical College in the 1905 college football season.

Schedule

References

Bennett Medical
Bennett Medical football seasons
Bennett Medical